Leonidas Varouxis was a Greek journalist and a politician. The Varouxises had familial ties with the Spilotopoulos family from Dimitsana, which participated in the Greek War of Independence of 1821.

Varouxis was born in Pyrgos and was descended from a family of journalists. In 1892, he ran the weekly paper Avgi.  He was a brother of Konstantinos Varouxis and was employed as a journalist at the newspaper Akropolis in the capital city of Athens.  He ran the first daily newspaper in Pyrgos Patris in 1902. He was counseled in the spiritual regeneration of his topic. He was educated as a journalist and a publisher of Gavriilidis of Akropolis.  In 1917, he wrote about the voting of the electorate area of Ilia, an area in which he conjectured that he knew in 1929, along with the sources which drew up from Ilia's newspapers.  He called off his publishing on the newspaper in which he made a new circulation by his nephew in 1955. 

Varouxis died in 1951.

References

19th-century births
1951 deaths
Year of birth missing
Greek journalists
Greek politicians
People from Pyrgos, Elis
Politicians from Elis
Pyrgos, Elis